Comanche is a city located in Comanche County in the U.S. state of Texas. The population was 4,335 at the 2010 census. It is the county seat of Comanche County.

History
A military road known as the "Corn Trail" came through in 1850 to supply area forts and encourage settlement. The town was established in 1856 and the city was incorporated in 1858.  Near the modern courthouse is the preserved log structure known as the "Old Cora Courthouse", one of the oldest standing wooden courthouses in Texas. Cora, the former county seat, later became Gustine.

Geography

Climate
The climate in this area is characterized by hot, humid summers and generally mild to cool winters.  According to the Köppen climate classification system, Comanche has a humid subtropical climate, Cfa on climate maps.

Demographics

2020 census

As of the 2020 United States census, there were 4,211 people, 1,592 households, and 990 families residing in the city.

2000 census
As of the census of 2000,  4,482 people, 1,656 households, and 1,157 families resided in the city. The population density was 998.3 people per square mile (385.4/km). The 1,898 housing units averaged 422.8 per square mile (163.2/km). The racial makeup of the city was 80.01% White, 1.20% African American, 1.09% Native American, 0.22% Asian, 15.13% from other races, and 2.34% from two or more races. Hispanics or Latinos of any race were 28.51% of the population.

Of the  1,656 households, 34.2% had children under the age of 18 living with them, 55.9% were married couples living together, 10.3% had a female householder with no husband present, and 30.1% were not families. About 28.2% of all households were made up of individuals, and 17.2% had someone living alone who was 65 years of age or older. The average household size was 2.56 and the average family size was 3.14.

In the city, the population was distributed as 28.0% under the age of 18, 7.5% from 18 to 24, 24.7% from 25 to 44, 19.5% from 45 to 64, and 20.2% who were 65 years of age or older. The median age was 36 years. For every 100 females, there were 88.1 males. For every 100 females age 18 and over, there were 87.2 males.

The median income for a household in the city was $26,773, and for a family was $32,097. Males had a median income of $26,646 versus $16,958 for females. The per capita income for the city was $12,155. About 17.0% of families and 20.0% of the population were below the poverty line, including 23.7% of those under age 18 and 19.7% of those age 65 or over.

Arts and culture
The Comanche County Historical Museum in Comanche features a blacksmith shop, filling station, and doctor's office. A replica saloon depicts the site where gunfighter John Wesley Hardin killed a deputy in 1874.

Education
The City of Comanche is served by the Comanche Independent School District, which consists of Comanche Elementary, Comanche Middle School, H.R. Jefferies Junior High, and Comanche High School. Also, Premier Accelerated Charter School for high school-aged students is located in Comanche.

Infrastructure

Transportation
The Comanche County-City Airport is located two nautical miles (2.3 mi, 3.7 km) northeast of Comanche's central business district.

See also
Ben F. Barnes
Robert T. Hill
Justin Holland
Fort Worth and Rio Grande Railway
David Kersh and Kerry Harvick, Country singers who reside in Comanche

References

External links
Comanche Chamber of Commerce

Photos of West Texas

Cities in Texas
Cities in Comanche County, Texas
County seats in Texas